Graeme Dyce and Harri Heliövaara won the title by defeating Stephen Donald and Rupesh Roy
6–2, 6–7(4–7), 6–3 in the final.

Seeds

Draw

Finals

Top half

Bottom half

Sources
Main Draw 

Boys' Doubles
2007 Boys' Doubles